Rio Adesola Frederick Adebisi (born 27 September 2000) is an English professional footballer who plays as a defender for Crewe Alexandra.

Adebisi was born in Croydon, Surrey; his family moved to Northwich, Cheshire in 2004. He joined Northwich side Barnton, playing mainly as an attacking box-to-box midfielder.

He joined Crewe Alexandra's Academy aged 12, progressing through the ranks to play under-23 games in 2018-19; he also went on loan to Leek Town. He made his first team debut, aged 18, at Gresty Road in an EFL Cup second round tie against Aston Villa on 27 August 2019, and made his league debut, coming on as a 79th-minute substitute for Harry Pickering, against Scunthorpe United at Gresty Road on 29 December 2019.

A foot injury limited his appearances during the remainder of the 2019-20 season, but he was offered a new contract in June 2020, and signed a new two-year deal at the end of July 2020. In October 2021, he signed a new contract through to 2024. In December 2022, Adebisi suffered another foot injury in a 2-1 win at Morecambe; this did not respond to treatment, and in March 2022 he required an operation that would sideline him for up to four months.

He returned to the first team in September 2022, and on 25 October 2022 scored his first Crewe goal, the equaliser in a 1-1 draw at AFC Wimbledon.

Career statistics

References

Living people
English footballers
English Football League players
Northern Premier League players
Crewe Alexandra F.C. players
Leek Town F.C. players
2000 births
Association football defenders
Footballers from Croydon